Oreskes is a surname. Notable people with the surname include:

 Daniel Oreskes, American actor
 Michael Oreskes (born 1954), American journalist
 Naomi Oreskes (born 1958), American historian of science